Orrin W. Burritt House is a historic home located at Weedsport in Cayuga County, New York.  It is a fashionable Italianate / Queen Anne style dwelling built about 1876.  It consists of a large, essentially rectangular, two story frame main block.  Notable features of the building include broadly projecting eaves supported by elaborate scroll brackets, dentils and modillions; large windows surrounded by elaborate wood trim; an imposing verandah with a wealth of Victorian-inspired ornamentation; and a Colonial Revival style porte-cochere added about 1912.  Also on the property is a carriage house built about 1876.

It was listed on the National Register of Historic Places in 2007.

References

External links

Houses on the National Register of Historic Places in New York (state)
Queen Anne architecture in New York (state)
Italianate architecture in New York (state)
Houses completed in 1876
Houses in Cayuga County, New York
National Register of Historic Places in Cayuga County, New York